Garcelon is a surname. Notable people with the surname include: 

Alonzo Garcelon (1813–1906), 36th Governor of Maine, US
A. A. Garcelon House, historic house in Auburn, Maine
Garcelon Field, outdoor stadium at Bates College, Lewiston, Maine
William F. Garcelon (1868–1949), American college football player, athlete and coach

See also
Garcelon Civic Centre, sporting facility in St. Stephen, New Brunswick, Canada